The Twelve Bens or Twelve Pins, also called the Benna Beola, is a mountain range of mostly sharp-peaked quartzite summits and ridges in the Connemara National Park in County Galway, in the west of Ireland.  The widest definition of the range includes the Garraun Complex to the north as well as several isolated peaks to the west, and is designated a  Special Area of Conservation.

The range is a popular location for hill-walking activities with the 16–kilometre 8–9 hour Glencoaghan Horseshoe (Gleann Chóchan), considered one of the best ridge-walks in Ireland. Topographically, the range is partnered with the Maumturks range to the east of the Inagh valley (a Western Way route); and both share a common geology being largely composed of metamorphic marine rocks, being predominantly resistant quartzite but with deposits of schists in the valleys (known as Connemara Dalradian rocks).

Naming
"Ben" an anglicized translation of the Irish language word "Binn", meaning "peak".  According to Irish academic Paul Tempan, "An odd thing about the Twelve Bens of Connemara is that nobody seems to know exactly which are the twelve peaks in question", and noting that there are almost 20 peaks with "Ben" or "Binn" in their name. Tempan notes that term "twelve peaks" can be at least dated to the Irish historian Ruaidhrí Ó Flaithbheartaigh, whose writings in 1684 said: "On the north-west of Ballynahinsy [Ballynahinch], are the twelve high mountaines of Bennabeola, called by marriners the twelve stakes [stacks], being the first land they discover as they come from the maine [sea]", but he did not list them.

Tempan notes the issue of "twelve" does not arise in the Irish language name as they are simply labelled "Na Beanna Beola", which translates as "the peaks of Beola".  Beola was a leader of the Fir Bolg, and a giant; his name appears in the Connemara village Toombeola, or Irish language "Tuaim Beola".

Geography

The Twelve Bens range is a core massif of 22 peaks above  in elevation, centred around the highest peak in the range, Benbaun .  To the north of this core massif lies the separate subsidiary massif of the Garraun Complex with 9 peaks around Garraun .  To the west of the core massif lies 7 other isolated or subsidiary "outlier" peaks, thus giving a total of 38 Bens with an elevation above 100 metres.

While the Bens are not as high as those of the ranges in Kerry (e.g. MacGillycuddy's Reeks and the Mountains of the Dingle Peninsula), their rocky peaks and ridges contrast with the surrounding sea-level landscape (unlike Kerry, there are no mountain-passes in Connemara), and give the range an imposing feel.

The range is bounded by the Inagh Valley and the R344 road to the east, while the N59 road (or, the "Clifden Road"), circles and bounds the core massif (and most of the outliers), from the southerly, westerly and northerly directions.  The Garraun Complex lies to the north of the N59 road at Kylemore Lough.

Core massif
The 22 peaks in the core massif of the Twelve Bens range naturally split into three sections:

The core massif is also known for its deep glaciated U-shaped valleys, around which groups of Bens lie in a "horseshoe formation":

Geology

The core massif of the Twelve Bens range are largely composed of metamorphic marine rocks, being predominantly resistant quartzite but with deposits of schists in the valleys (known as Connemara Dalradian rocks).

These rocks derive from sediments that were deposited in a warm shelf sea some 700 to 550 million years ago (e.g. Precambrian-Cambrian).  Movements in the earth's crust, and the closure of the Iapetus Ocean, transformed these sediments into crystalline schists that lie underneath the base of the mountain range, which local erosion and uplift then brought to the surface.  The summits of the core massif (and some outliers) are made of weather-resistant quartzite, while the sides of the peaks are composed of schists and grey marbles.

In contrast, the mountains to the north of the core Twelve Bens massif, the Garraun Complex, have a different type of geology, that is composed of gneiss and different forms of sandstones and mudstones.

Scattered throughout the range are parts of gabbro (Doughruagh and Currywongaun), mica schist (Muckanaght), and outcrops of marble (south of Kylemore Lough).

The final Ice Age, circa 10,000 years ago, also sculpted the landscape leaving behind deposits of sand and gravel; there are widespread boulder-clay and erratic boulders across the range.

Special Area of Conservation (SAC)

The entire Twelve Bens range (including the Garraun Complex) is a Special Area of Conservation (SAC) (Site Code:002031), as selected for a range of habitats and species listed under the Annex I / II of the E.U. Habitats Directive.  The items of note on the SAC habitats list includes: Oligotrophic Waters, Alpine Heaths, Active Blanket Bogs, remnants of Oak Woodland, Rhynchosporion Vegetation, and Siliceous Scree and Rocky Slopes; while the species list includes: Freshwater Pearl Mussel, Atlantic Salmon, Otter, and Slender Naiad.  In addition, the 16,163-hectare site includes a some of the rarer Red Data Book species of plant.  The SAC directive on the range describes it as "One of the largest and most varied sites of conservation interest in Ireland".

Climbing
The range is popular with hill walkers, fell runners, and rock climbers,

Hill walking

The Irish Times outdoors correspondent, John G. Dwyer, said of the Twelve Bens, "These are true kickass mountains, with criminally stunning views [..]".
 
The  8–9 hour Glencoaghan Horseshoe is noted as providing some of the "most exhilarating mountaineering in Ireland", and is called "a true classic" by guidebook authors.  Other similar distanced  "horseshoe" loop walks are the 19–kilometre 10–12 hour Owenglin Horseshoe, the 15–kilometre 8–9 hour Gleninagh Horseshoe, and the 14–kilometre 6–7 hour Glencorbet Horseshoe.

An even more serious undertaking is the  Twelve Bens Challenge, climbing all 12 Bens in a single 24-hour day.

Rock climbing

The Twelve Bens have a number of rock climbing locations, the most notable of which is in the Gleann Eighneach valley at the eastern spur of Benncorr (from Binn an tSaighdiúra to Bencorrbeg; also called "Carrot Ridge" ).  The climbs vary from Diff (D) to Very Severe (VS) and range from 150 metres to 320 metres in length, with notable routes being Carrot Ridge (275m D), and Seventh Heaven (330m HS).

List of peaks

The following is a download from the MountainViews Online Database, who list 38 identifiable peaks in the wider Twelve Bens range (i.e. core massif, Garraun complex, and various outliers to the west), with an elevation, or height, above 

The list below highlights the 12 Bens most associated with being the Twelve Bens from Ó Flaithbheartaigh's original record.

See also

Mweelrea, major range in Killary Harbour
Maumturks, major range in Connemara
List of Irish counties by highest point
Lists of mountains in Ireland
Lists of mountains and hills in the British Isles

Notes

References

Further reading

External links
 Mountainview: The Twelve Bens Range
 The Twelve Bens Challenge: Routecard (2015)
 Irish Rock Climbing Database: Gleann Eighneach
 Irish Rock Climbing Database: Inagh Valley (Benorr & Derryclare)

Connemara
Mountains and hills of County Galway
Gaeltacht places in County Galway